Zsiga Pankotia (or Pankotai) was a 31-year-old Hungarian-born murderer who was hanged on Thursday, 29 June 1961 at Armley Gaol, Leeds, West Yorkshire, (now HM Prison Leeds). He was hanged by Harry Allen for the murder of Jack Eli Myers in a house burglary in the city's affluent Roundhay district. Under the Homicide Act 1957, murder during the course or furtherance of theft was considered capital murder and the sentence in the event of conviction was one of death. He was the last man to be hanged at Armley Gaol.

Pankotia was tried, convicted and sentenced at Leeds Assizes (then seated at Leeds Town Hall). The hanging was the first in Leeds since 1959.

References

External links
 Sheffield Forum - Has there ever been a prison in Sheffield? - Page 3

1930 births
1961 deaths
People executed for murder
Executed Hungarian people
Hungarian people executed abroad
20th-century executions by England and Wales
1961 murders in the United Kingdom